Ramrajya is an Hindi film based on political drama produced under the banner of Li Helios films. Actress Rakul Preet Singh's brother Aman Preet is making Bollywood debut with this movie. Punjabi actress Shobita Rana also doing her debut with Ramrajya. The renowned actor Govind Namdev can be seen as playing Aman's Guru. the songs are sung by famous singer Kailash Kher , Raja Hasan  and Gul Saxena( famous RadhaKrishn serial fame).

Production
Produced by Prabir Sinha, directed and edited by Nitesh Rai, story by Shivanad Sinha and screenplay and dialogue by Mohana Prasad. The film has been shot in Mumbai, Varanasi, Bokaro and Ranchi. The film will be released on 4 November 2022.

Synopsis
Ramrajya a is a Political drama revolves around enhancing and modifying the social obstacles. The fil work towards eliminating the corruption, communal violence, health, education etc. It describes the ideal state of the society where people live together in peace and harmony without the fear and aggression while following their own religion, beliefs and philosophy.

Cast
 Aman Preet Singh as Lucky
 Shobita Rana as Sapna
 Sandeep Bhojak as Nirbhaya
 Salman Shaikh as Abrar
 Rajesh Sharma as M P Shukla
 Govind Namdeo as Lucky's Guruji
 Manoj Bakshi as Cercle officer
 Mukhtar Dekhani as MP Shukla's brother
 Mushtaq Khan as MP Shukla's PA
 Meena Pulli as Lucky's mother
 Chandrashekhar as Lucky's father
 Shashwat Pratik as Lucky (18 years old)
 Baby Rash Rai as Lucky (3 years)

References

External links
Ramrajya Movie: Review | Release Date (2022) | Songs | Music | Images | Official Trailers | Videos | Photos | News - Bollywood Hungama

https://www.cinestaan.com/movies/ram-rajya-43011
Ramrajya

Upcoming films
Hindi-language drama films
Indian drama films
2022 drama films
2022 films